is a Japanese song commemorating 1940.  It was written by Yoshio Masuda and composed by Gihachirō Mori.

History 
The song was originally written for a competition in 1939, in which it was selected as the winner.  Even recently, uyoku dantai groups celebrating National Foundation Day air this song using sound trucks.

Parody 
A parody version of this song, concerning the rising cost of tobacco, replaces the original lyrics with the names of cigarette brands.

References 

1940 in Japan

1939 songs
Japanese-language songs
Japanese patriotic songs